Philodromops is a monotypic genus of Brazilian running crab spiders containing the single species, Philodromops coccineus. It was first described by Cândido Firmino de Mello-Leitão in 1943, and is only found in Brazil.

See also
 List of Philodromidae species

References

Monotypic Araneomorphae genera
Philodromidae
Spiders of Brazil
Taxa named by Cândido Firmino de Mello-Leitão